Fisht Al Eij is an area of ​​land formed naturally above sea level located within Kuwait's territorial water near border of Iraq.

References

Landforms of Kuwait